Tanai is a town in the Kachin State of northernmost part of the Union of Myanmar.

Tanai may also refer to:
Tanai Township, a township of Myitkyina District in the Kachin State of Burma

People with the surname
Shahnawaz Tanai, former communist general
Sara Levi-Tanai (c. 1910–2005), Israeli choreographer and songwriter

See also
Tanais (disambiguation)